Transformers is a media franchise produced by American toy company Hasbro and Japanese toy company Takara Tomy. It primarily follows the heroic Autobots and the villainous Decepticons, two alien robot factions at war that can transform into other forms, such as vehicles and animals. The franchise encompasses toys, animation, comic books, video games and films.

The franchise began in 1984 with the Transformers toy line, comprising transforming mecha toys from Takara's Diaclone and Micro Change toylines rebranded for Western markets. The term "Generation 1" covers both the animated television series The Transformers and the comic book series of the same name, which are further divided into Japanese, British and Canadian spin-offs, respectively. Sequels followed, such as the Generation 2 comic book and Beast Wars TV series, which became its own mini-universe. Generation 1 characters underwent two reboots with Dreamwave Productions in 2001 and IDW Publishing in 2005, with a third starting in 2019. There have been other incarnations of the story based on different toy lines during and after the 20th century. The first was the Robots in Disguise series, followed by three shows (Armada, Energon, and Cybertron) that constitute a single universe called the "Unicron Trilogy".

A live-action film series started in 2007, again distinct from previous incarnations, while the Transformers: Animated series merged concepts from the G1 continuity, the 2007 live-action film and the "Unicron Trilogy". For most of the 2010s, in an attempt to mitigate the wave of reboots, the "Aligned Continuity" was established. In 2018, Transformers: Cyberverse debuted, once again, distinct from the previous incarnations.

Although initially a separate and competing franchise started in 1983, Tonka's GoBots became the intellectual property of Hasbro after their buyout of Tonka in 1991. Subsequently, the universe depicted in the animated series Challenge of the GoBots and follow-up film GoBots: Battle of the Rock Lords was retroactively established as an alternate universe within the Transformers multiverse.

Fiction

Transformers: Generation 1 (1984–1993)

Generation One is a retroactive term for the Transformers characters that appeared between 1984 and 1993. The Transformers began with the 1980s Japanese toy lines Micro Change and Diaclone. They presented robots able to transform into everyday vehicles, electronic items or weapons. Hasbro bought the Micro Change and Diaclone toys, and partnered with Takara. Marvel Comics was hired by Hasbro to create the backstory; editor-in-chief Jim Shooter wrote an overall story, and gave the task of creating the characters to writer Dennis O'Neil. Unhappy with O'Neil's work (although O'Neil created the name "Optimus Prime"), Shooter chose Bob Budiansky to create the characters.

The Transformers mecha were largely designed by Shōji Kawamori, the creator of the Japanese mecha anime franchise Macross (which was adapted into the Robotech franchise in North America). Kawamori came up with the idea of transforming mechs while working on the Diaclone and Macross franchises in the early 1980s (such as the VF-1 Valkyrie in Macross and Robotech), with his Diaclone mechs later providing the basis for Transformers.

The primary concept of Generation One is that the heroic Optimus Prime, the villainous Megatron, and their finest soldiers crash land on pre-historic Earth in the Ark and the Nemesis before awakening in 1985, Cybertron hurtling through the Neutral zone as an effect of the war. The Marvel comic was originally part of the main Marvel Universe, with appearances from Spider-Man and Nick Fury, plus some cameos, as well as a visit to the Savage Land.

The Transformers TV series began around the same time. Produced by Sunbow Productions and Marvel Productions, later Hasbro Productions, from the start it contradicted Budiansky's backstories. The TV series shows the Autobots looking for new energy sources, and crash landing as the Decepticons attack. Marvel interpreted the Autobots as destroying a rogue asteroid approaching Cybertron. Shockwave is loyal to Megatron in the TV series, keeping Cybertron in a stalemate during his absence, but in the comic book he attempts to take command of the Decepticons. The TV series would also differ wildly from the origins Budiansky had created for the Dinobots, the Decepticon turned Autobot Jetfire (known as Skyfire on TV), the Constructicons (who combine to form Devastator), and Omega Supreme. The Marvel comic establishes early on that Prime wields the Creation Matrix, which gives life to machines. In the second season, the two-part episode The Key to Vector Sigma introduced the ancient Vector Sigma computer, which served the same original purpose as the Creation Matrix (giving life to Transformers), and its guardian Alpha Trion.

In 1986, the cartoon became the film The Transformers: The Movie, which is set in the year 2005. It introduced the Matrix as the "Autobot Matrix of Leadership", as a fatally wounded Prime gives it to Ultra Magnus; however, as Prime dies he drops the matrix, which is then caught by Hot Rod who subsequently becomes Rodimus Prime later on in the film. Unicron, a transformer who devours planets, fears its power and recreates a heavily damaged Megatron as Galvatron, as well as Bombshell or Skywarp becoming Cyclonus, Thundercracker becoming Scourge and two other Insecticons becoming Scourge's huntsmen, the Sweeps. Eventually, Rodimus Prime takes out the Matrix and destroys Unicron. In the United Kingdom, the weekly comic book interspliced original material to keep up with U.S. reprints, and The Movie provided much new material. Writer Simon Furman proceeded to expand the continuity with movie spin-offs involving the time travelling Galvatron. The Movie also featured guest voices from Leonard Nimoy as Galvatron, Scatman Crothers as Jazz, Casey Kasem as Cliffjumper, Orson Welles as Unicron and Eric Idle as the leader of the Junkions (Wreck-Gar, though unnamed in the movie). The Transformers theme tune for the film was performed by Lion with "Weird Al" Yankovic adding a song to the soundtrack.

The third season followed up The Movie, with the revelation of the Quintessons having used Cybertron as a factory. Their robots rebel, and in time the workers become the Autobots and the soldiers become the Decepticons. (Note: This appears to contradict background presented in the first two seasons of the series.) It is the Autobots who develop transformation. Due to popular demand, Optimus Prime is resurrected at the conclusion of the third season, and the series ended with a three-episode story arc. However, the Japanese broadcast of the series was supplemented with a newly produced OVA, Scramble City, before creating entirely new series to continue the storyline, ignoring the 1987 end of the American series. The extended Japanese run consisted of The Headmasters, Super-God Masterforce, Victory and Zone, then in illustrated magazine form as Battlestars: Return of Convoy and Operation: Combination. Just as the TV series was wrapping up, Marvel continued to expand its continuity. It followed The Movie'''s example by killing Prime and Megatron, albeit in the present day. Dinobot leader Grimlock takes over as Autobot leader. There was a G.I. Joe crossover and the limited series The Transformers: Headmasters, which further expanded the scope to the planet Nebulon. It led on to the main title resurrecting Prime as a Powermaster.

In the United Kingdom, the mythology continued to grow. Primus was introduced as the creator of the Transformers, to serve his material body that is planet Cybertron and fight his nemesis Unicron. Female Autobot Arcee also appeared, despite the comic book stating the Transformers had no concept of gender, with her backstory of being built by the Autobots to quell human accusations of sexism. Soundwave, Megatron's second-in-command, also broke the fourth wall in the letters page, criticising the cartoon continuity as an inaccurate representation of history. The UK also had a crossover in Action Force, the UK counterpart to G.I. Joe. The comic book featured a resurrected Megatron, whom Furman retconned to be a clone when he took over the U.S. comic book, which depicted Megatron as still dead. The U.S. comic would last for 80 issues until 1991, and the UK comic lasted 332 issues and several annuals, until it was replaced as Dreamwave Productions, later in the 20th-Century.

In 2009, Shout! Factory released the entire G1 series in a 16-DVD box set called the Matrix of Leadership Edition. They also released the same content as individual seasons.

Transformers: Generation 2 (1993–1995)

It was five issues of the G.I. Joe comic in 1993 that would springboard a return for Marvel's Transformers, with the new twelve-issue series Transformers: Generation 2, to market a new toy line.

This story revealed that the Transformers originally breed asexually, though it is stopped by Primus as it produced the evil Swarm. A new empire, neither Autobot nor Decepticon, is bringing it back, however. Though the year-long arc wrapped itself up with an alliance between Optimus Prime and Megatron, the final panel introduced the Liege Maximo, ancestor of the Decepticons. This minor cliffhanger was not resolved until 2001 and 2002's Transforce convention when writer Simon Furman concluded his story in the exclusive novella Alignment.

Beast Wars and Beast Machines (1996–2000)

The story focused on a small group of Maximals (the new Autobots), led by Optimus Primal, and Predacons, led by Megatron, 300 years after the "Great War". After a dangerous pursuit through transwarp space, both the Maximal and Predacon factions end up crash landing on a primitive, uncivilized planet similar to Earth, but with two moons and a dangerous level of Energon (which is later revealed to be prehistoric Earth with an artificial second moon, taking place sometime during the 4 million year period in which the Autobots and Decepticons were in suspended animation from the first episode of the original Transformers cartoon), which forces them to take organic beast forms in order to function without going into stasis lock. After writing this first episode, Bob Forward and Larry DiTillio learned of the G1 Transformers, and began to use elements of it as a historical backstory to their scripts, establishing Beast Wars as a part of the Generation 1 universe through numerous callbacks to both the cartoon and Marvel comic. By the end of the first season, the second moon and the Energon are revealed to have been constructed by a mysterious alien race known as the Vok.

The destruction of the second moon releases mysterious energies that make some of the characters "transmetal" and the planet is revealed to be prehistoric Earth, leading to the discovery of the Ark. Megatron attempts to kill the original Optimus Prime, but at the beginning of the third season, Primal manages to preserve his spark. In the two-season follow-up series, Beast Machines, Cybertron is revealed to have organic origins, which Megatron attempts to stamp out.

After the first season of Beast Wars (comprising 26 episodes) aired in Japan, the Japanese were faced with a problem. The second Canadian season was only 13 episodes long, not enough to warrant airing on Japanese TV. While they waited for the third Canadian season to be completed (thereby making 26 episodes in total when added to season 2), they produced two exclusive cel-animated series of their own, Beast Wars II (also called Beast Wars Second) and Beast Wars Neo, to fill in the gap. Dreamwave retroactively revealed Beast Wars to be the future of their G1 universe, and the 2006 IDW comic book Beast Wars: The Gathering eventually confirmed the Japanese series to be canon within a story set during Season 3.

Beast Wars contained elements from both the G1 cartoon series and comics. Attributes taken from the cartoon include Transformers that were female, the appearance of Starscream (who mentions being killed off by Galvatron in The Transformers: The Movie), and appearances of the Plasma Energy Chamber and Key to Vector Sigma. The naming of the Transformer ship, the "Ark" (and reference to 1984, the year the Transformers on board were revived) and the character, Ravage being shown as intelligent, and Cybertron having an organic core were elements taken from the comics.

In 2011, Shout! Factory released the complete series of Beast Wars on DVD.

Dreamwave Productions (2001–2005)
In 2001, Dreamwave Productions began a new universe of annual comics adapted from Marvel, but also included elements of the animated. The Dreamwave stories followed the concept of the Autobots defeating the Decepticons on Earth, but their 1997 return journey to Cybertron on the Ark II is destroyed by Shockwave, now ruler of the planet. The story follows on from there, and was told in two six-issue limited series, then a ten-issue ongoing series. The series also added extra complexities such as not all Transformers believing in the existence of Primus, corruption in the Cybertronian government that first lead Megatron to begin his war and Earth having an unknown relevance to Cybertron.Brad Mick, Adam Patyk (w), Don Figueroa (p), "Atonement" Transformers: Generation One #6, June 2004, Dreamwave Productions

Three Transformers: The War Within limited series were also published. These are set at the beginning of the Great War, and identify Prime as once being a clerk named Optronix. Beast Wars was also retroactively stated as the future of this continuity, with the profile series More than Meets the Eye showing the Predacon Megatron looking at historical files detailing Dreamwave's characters and taking his name from the original Megatron. In 2004, this real life universe also inspired three novels and a Dorling Kindersley guide, which focused on Dreamwave as the "true" continuity when discussing in-universe elements of the characters. In a new twist, Primus and Unicron are siblings, formerly a being known as The One. Transformers: Micromasters, set after the Ark's disappearance, was also published. The real life universe was disrupted when Dreamwave went bankrupt in 2005. This left the Generation One story hanging and the third volume of The War Within half finished. Plans for a comic book set between Beast Wars and Beast Machines were also left unrealized.

G.I. Joe crossovers (2003–present)
Throughout the years, the G1 characters have also starred in crossovers with fellow Hasbro property G.I. Joe, but whereas those crossovers published by Marvel were in continuity with their larger storyline, those released by Dreamwave and G.I. Joe publisher Devil's Due Publishing occupy their own separate real life universes. In Devil's Due, the terrorist organization Cobra is responsible for finding and reactivating the Transformers. Dreamwave's version reimagines the familiar G1 and G.I. Joe characters in a World War II setting, and a second limited series was released set in the present day, though Dreamwave's bankruptcy meant it was cancelled after a single issue. Devil's Due had Cobra re-engineer the Transformers to turn into familiar Cobra vehicles, and released further mini-series that sent the characters travelling through time, battling Serpentor and being faced with the combined menace of Cobra-La and Unicron. During this time, Cobra teams up with the Decepticons. IDW Publishing has expressed interest in their own crossover.

IDW publishing (2005–2022)

The following year, IDW Publishing rebooted the G1 series from scratch within various limited series and one shots. This allowed long-time writer of Marvel and Dreamwave comics, Simon Furman to create his own universe without continuity hindrance, similar to Ultimate Marvel. This new continuity originally consisted of a comic book series titled The Transformers with a companion series known as The Transformers: Spotlight. The main series was broken up into several story arcs. Eventually, with IDW Publishing losing sales, the series was given a soft reboot. Beginning with All Hail Megatron, the series was set in a new direction, discarding the mini series and Spotlight format with ongoing comics. By 2012 the series had split into three ongoing series; The Transformers: More Than Meets The Eye, The Transformers: Robots in Disguise (which later changed in 2015 to "The Transformers") and The Transformers: Till All Are One. In 2022, it was announced that IDW lost the publishing rights to Transformers.

Alternative stories
In January 2006, the Hasbro Transformers Collectors' Club comic wrote a story based on the Transformers Classics toy line, set in the Marvel Comics universe, but excluding the Generation 2 comic. Fifteen years after Megatron crash lands in the Ark with Ratchet, the war continues with the characters in their Classics bodies.

IDW Publishing introduced The Transformers: Evolutions in 2006, a collection of mini-series that re-imagine and reinterpret the G1 characters in various ways. To date, only one miniseries has been published, Hearts of Steel, placing the characters in an Industrial Revolution-era setting. The series was delayed as Hasbro did not want to confuse newcomers with too many fictional universes before the release of the live-action film.

However, IDW and the original publisher Marvel Comics announced a crossover storyline with the Avengers to coincide with the film New Avengers/Transformers. The story is set on the borders of Symkaria and Latveria, and its fictional universe is set between the first two New Avengers storylines, as well in between the Infiltration and Escalation phase of IDW's The Transformers. IDW editor-in-chief, Chris Ryall hinted at elements of it being carried over into the main continuities, and that a sequel is possible. In June 2018 it was announced there would be Star Trek and Transformers Crossover being released in September 2018.

Robots in Disguise (2000–2001)

First broadcast in Japan in 2000, Robots in Disguise was a single animated series consisting of thirty-nine episodes. It was exported to other countries in subsequent years. In this continuity, Megatron recreates the Decepticons as a subfaction of the Predacons on Earth, a potential reference to the return to the vehicle-based characters following the previous dominance of the animal-based characters of the Beast eras. It is a stand-alone universe with no ties to any other Transformers fiction, though some of the characters from Robots in Disguise did eventually make appearances in Transformers: Universe, including Optimus Prime, Ultra Magnus, Side Burn and Prowl.

The show was heavily censored in the U.S. due to its content of buildings being destroyed and terrorism references after the 9/11 attacks on the World Trade Centers. The show was eventually banned from cable TV networks in the U.S.

The Unicron Trilogy (2002–2006)

These three lines, launched in 2002 and dubbed the "Unicron Trilogy" by Transformers designer Aaron Archer, are co-productions between Takara and (lesser extent) Hasbro, simultaneously released in both countries, each lasting 52 episodes. Armada followed the Autobots and Decepticons discovering the powerful Mini-Cons on Earth, which are revealed by the end to be weapons of Unicron. Energon, set ten years later, followed the Autobots and the Omnicons in their fight to stop the Decepticons and the Terrorcons from resurrecting Unicron with energon.

In Japan, the series Transformers: Cybertron showed no ties to the previous two series, telling its own story. This caused continuity problems when Hasbro sold Cybertron as a follow-up to Armada/Energon. The writers attempted to change certain plot elements from the Japanese version to remedy this, although this largely added up to nothing more than references to Unicron, Primus, Primes and Minicons.

Just as Marvel produced a companion comic to Generation One, Dreamwave Productions published the comic Transformers Armada set in a different continuity to the cartoon. At #19, it became Transformers Energon. Dreamwave went bankrupt and ceased all publications before the storyline could be completed at #30. However, the Transformers Fan Club published a few stories set in the Cybertron era.

Transformers: Universe (2003–present)
The storyline of Transformers: Universe, mainly set following Beast Machines, sees characters from many assorted alternate continuities, including existing and new ones, encountering each other. The story was told in an unfinished comic book exclusive to the Official Transformers Collectors' Convention.

Live-action film franchise (2007–present)

In 2007, Michael Bay directed a live-action film based on Transformers, with Steven Spielberg serving as executive producer. It stars Shia LaBeouf, Josh Duhamel, Megan Fox, and Tyrese Gibson in the lead human cast while voice actors Peter Cullen and Hugo Weaving voice Optimus Prime and Megatron, respectively. Transformers received mixed to positive reviews and was a box office success. It is the forty-fifth highest-grossing film and the fifth highest-grossing film of 2007, grossing approximately $709 million worldwide. The film won four awards from the Visual Effects Society and was nominated for three Academy Awards, for Best Sound Editing, Best Sound Mixing, and Best Visual Effects. The performance of Shia Labeouf was praised by Empire, and Peter Cullen's reprisal of Optimus Prime from the 1980s was well received by fans. A sequel, Transformers: Revenge of the Fallen, was released on June 24, 2009. It received mostly negative reviews, but was a commercial success and grossed more than its predecessor. A third film, Transformers: Dark of the Moon, was released on June 29, 2011, in 3-D and went on to gross over $1 billion, with mixed reviews. A fourth film, Transformers: Age of Extinction, was released on June 27, 2014, which also grossed over $1 billion, though it got mixed to negative reviews. A fifth film, Transformers: The Last Knight was released on June 23, 2017. Bumblebee was released on December 21, 2018, serving as a prequel to the first film, although it has since been declared a reboot of the film franchise.

Transformers: Animated (2007–2010)Transformers: Animated is a cartoon that was aired in early 2008 on Cartoon Network in the United States. Originally scheduled for late after 2007 under the title of Transformers: Heroes, Transformers Animated is set in 2050 Detroit (after crash landing 50 years earlier), when robots and humans live side by side. The Autobots come to Earth and assume superhero roles, battling evil humans with the Decepticons having a smaller role until Megatron resurfaces. Main characters include Autobots Optimus Prime, Bumblebee, Bulkhead, Prowl, and Ratchet; Decepticons Megatron, Starscream, Blitzwing, Lugnut, and Blackarachnia; and humans Professor Sumdac and Sari Sumdac. Several characters that were in the original Transformers cartoon and 1986 animated movie, as well as characters only seen in comics and such, make special appearances and cameos throughout the show, with various voice actors (including Corey Burton, John Moschitta, Jr., Susan Blu, and Judd Nelson) reprising their roles.

Aligned Universe (2010–present)
Hasbro, in an attempt to stop the wave of reboots that started in 2001, created the Aligned Universe, with the intent to unify every Transformers media into one continuity. The name of this continuity, however is not official; it was adopted by the fans after Hasbro referred to it as an "Aligned Continuity".

The toy lines derived from this continuity are Transformers: Generations, Transformers: Rescue Bots, and Transformers Go!. The television series belonging to the Aligned Universe include Transformers: Prime (including its concluding film Prime Beast Hunters: Predacons Rising), the Rescue Bots TV series, its sequel Transformers: Rescue Bots Academy, the Go! anime adaptation, and the 2015 series Transformers: Robots in Disguise.

The video games that are part of this shared universe are Transformers: War for Cybertron (including its Nintendo DS version and the companion Transformers: Cybertron Adventures), Transformers: Fall of Cybertron, the Prime video game adaptation, and Transformers: Rise of the Dark Spark, that serves as a conclusion of the Cybertron series and crossover with the live-action film video game series.

So far four novels have been published: Transformers: Exodus, Transformers: Exiles, Transformers: Retribution, and Transformers: The Covenant of Primus. The first three were published by Del Rey Books, while Covenant of Primus was published by 47North. In addition, IDW Publishing has published several comic books, including graphic novels, while Titan Magazines published Transformers Comic UK, a 20 issues series from 2007 to 2014.

The video games, novels, and television series contradict each other due to creative differences, miscommunications, constant team changes, and Aaron Archer being replaced with a different person that had no knowledge of the 354-page brand bible, "The Binder of Revelation".

Transformers: Prime Wars Trilogy (2016–2018)

In August 2016, Machinima and Hasbro co-produced a computer-animated series named Combiner Wars, simultaneously published on the website Go90 and YouTube. This was followed by two further installments, Titans Return and Power of the Primes.
Eric Calderon was executive producer of the trilogy. The events of the series take place 40 years after the end of the Autobot/Decepticon civil war, with the Transformers having returned to Cyberton and now being threatened by ancient technology.

The trailer for Combiner Wars was released on July 26, 2016, along with four prequel episodes. Eight five-minute episodes of the series Combiner Wars were released weekly beginning on August 2. The cast of the Combiner Wars was predominantly made up of famous YouTube personalities. The first series was included as a bonus feature on the Transformers: The Last Knight Blu-ray release.

The second series, dubbed Titans Return featured returning voice cast from previous iterations of Transformers, such as Peter Cullen and Judd Nelson, along with newcomers such as Michael Dorn as Perceptor and Wil Wheaton as Fortress Maximus. Guest voices included Mark Hamill and Ron Perlman. Titans Return debuted on November 14, 2017, on the Go90 platform, consisting of ten episodes at roughly 11 minutes each. The series featured returning Titan characters such as Metroplex, Fortress Maximus and Trypticon and the resultant destruction such enormous characters create.

The third part of the trilogy, dubbed Power of the Primes was launched on May 1, 2018, comprising 10 episodes released weekly, each roughly 11 minutes long. FJ DeSanto was executive producer of the third installment. Animation was done by Tatsunoko Productions. Power of the Primes focused on the arrival of Megatronus, one of the original Primes. In 2019, Machinima shut down and folded into Otter Media. On January 19, Machinima removed all of its videos from YouTube, including those of the Prime Wars Trilogy. After the shutdown, a number of former Machinima creations returned to the web via Rooster Teeth. The series is available on the Rooster Teeth website.

Transformers: Cyberverse (2018–2020)

Produced by Boulder Media Limited, Hasbro Studios and Allspark Animation for Cartoon Network, it started airing on September 1, 2018.

Two seasons, named "Chapters", were planned, with the first aired in 2018 and with the second, subtitled Power of the Spark, planned for 2019.Cyberverse uses characters and elements across G1, Beast Era, the live-action film series, Animated, and the Aligned continuity. It is notable for being the first television series of the franchise to have an 11-minute runtime (the latter two installments of the Prime Wars Trilogy have first utilized this format) and for having a New York cast instead of the usual Los Angeles one.

Transformers: War for Cybertron Trilogy (2019)

The Transformers: War for Cybertron Trilogy is a 3D computer-animated three-part series that was developed as a co-production between Rooster Teeth, Netflix and Hasbro. Polygon Pictures was chosen as the animation studio. Headed by FJ DeSanto, a veteran of Transformers animation having previously worked on two installments of the Power of the Primes trilogy, the series tells the origin of the civil war between the Autobots and Decepticons. Comprising three parts, the series was announced on February 15, 2019, for release on Netflix. The voice cast of the show used new actors for recognizable characters such as Jake Foushou as Optimus Prime and Jason Marnocha as Megatron. Each series is made up of six episodes, each a half hour long. The series also had a tie-in toyline.

A trailer of for the first installment Siege was released on July 8, 2020, with the show following on July 30, 2020, The first series focused on the civil war on Cybertron and the conflict between the two leaders of the opposing factions, Optimus Prime and Megatron, along with the introduction of a third, mercenary, faction.

A trailer for the second series, dubbed Earthrise, was published on December 7, 2020 The second series debuted on Netflix on December 30. Earthrise was more limited in scope than the previous series. Instead of the entire Transformer civil war, this series focused on the two leaders once again and the crews of their starships as Optimus sought to flee Cybertron and find the missing Allspark. The series also saw the introduction of a fourth faction, the Quintessons.

The trailer for the final series, Kingdom, debuted on July 5, 2021 and the series premiered on Netflix on July 29. Kingdom picks up where the last series left off with Optimus and Megatron searching for the Allspark, having now crash-landed on Earth. On the planet, they encounter characters previously seen in the older series Transformers: Beast Wars. The third series was the final one, as Hasbro has no plans for a fourth series.

Transformers: EarthSpark

See alsoGundamMacross''
List of space science fiction franchises
Mecha anime and manga

References

External links

 G1 Transformers toy figures and parts identification archive at Transformerland.com
 Transformers.com - Official Hasbro Transformers web site
 Transformers official YouTube channel

Fictional extraterrestrial robots
Fiction about shapeshifting
Hasbro franchises
Mass media franchises
Mass media franchises introduced in 1984
Science fiction franchises
Super robot anime and manga
Takara Tomy franchises
Transformers
Military fiction